Colin Davis (born 1960) is professor of French at Royal Holloway, University of London. He is known for his research on French literature and Levinas's thought.

Books
 Levinas: An Introduction, Cambridge: Polity Press, 1996
 After Poststructuralism: Reading, Stories and Theory, 2004
 Ethical Issues in Twentieth-Century French Fiction (2000) 
 French Fiction in the Mitterrand Years (with Elizabeth Fallaize, 2000).

References

External links
 Colin Davis at University of London

21st-century British philosophers
Continental philosophers
Hermeneutists
Philosophy academics
1960 births
Living people
Academics of Royal Holloway, University of London
Levinas scholars